Fiebre de juventud (English: "Youth Fever"), also known as Romance en Ecuador (English: "Romance in Ecuador"), is a 1966 Mexican-Ecuadorian musical comedy film directed by Alfonso Corona Blake and starring Enrique Guzmán, Begoña Palacios, Rosa María Vázquez and Fernando Luján.

Plot
Carlos and Luis drop out of school and try to make it big with a music group, with considerable success. They travel to Ecuador and they meet two sisters, the beautiful Rita and the prudish Silvia. Luis and Rita fall madly in love and want to get married, but the sisters' father Don Jaime says the marriage has a condition: Silvia must get married first. Luis tries to convince Carlos to woo Silvia, but the two couldn't treat each other worse. However, their experiences together will cause love to be born out of hatred.

Cast
Enrique Guzmán as Carlos
Begoña Palacios as Silvia
Rosa María Vázquez as Rita
Fernando Luján as Luis
Ernesto Albán as Don Jaime
Lucho Gálvez
Alejandro Mata
Julio Jaramillo

Production
It was filmed in June 1965 in Guayaquil. It was one of several Mexican film productions that were shot on Ecuador, alongside films such as Peligro, mujeres en acción, Cómo enfriar a mi marido, 24 horas de placer, and Caín, abel y el otro.

Release
It was released on the Variedades and Carrusel cinemas on 20 August 1966 as a preview, and on the Metropolitan cinema on 1 September 1966 as the normal release, for three weeks.

References

External links

1966 films
1966 musical comedy films
Ecuadorian comedy films
Films directed by Alfonso Corona Blake
Films shot in Ecuador
Mexican musical comedy films
1960s Spanish-language films
1960s Mexican films